Serenity in Fire is the seventh studio album from Canadian death metal band Kataklysm. The spoken passage in the track The Ambassador of Pain is a quote from Paul Newman's character in the film, Road to Perdition. Peter Tägtgren contributed guest vocals on the album.

The song "As I Slither" was featured on the soundtrack for the film  Alone in the Dark (2005) via Nuclear Blast, considered to be one of the worst movies ever created, featuring the actress Tara Reid.

The song "The Night They Returned" was originally composed for the feature film (also titled 'The Night They Returned') by independent filmmaker Sv Bell. Ultimately Nuclear Blast did not authorize the use of the track for the film. Members of the band make a brief cameo in the movie, released in 2004.

Track listing

Personnel
Kataklysm
Maurizio Iacono - Vocals
Jean-François Dagenais - Guitar
Stephane Barbe - Bass
Martin Maurais - Drums

Guest musicians
Peter Tägtgren - Guest vocals on "For All Our Sins"
Jordan Dare - Guest vocals on "10 Seconds from the End"

Production
Jean-François Dagenais - Producer, engineering, mixing
Bernard Belly - Mastering
Yannick St. Amand - Engineering
Maurizio Iacono - Lyrics
Markus Staiger - Executive producer

References

2004 albums
Kataklysm albums
Nuclear Blast albums